{{Infobox settlement
| name                     = Katsina State
| official_name            = 
| type                     = State
| image_alt                = 
| image_caption            = 
| image_flag               = 
| flag_alt                 = 
| image_seal               = Seal of Katsina State.png
| seal_alt                 = Seal of Katsina State
| nickname                 = Home of Hospitality
| image_map                = Nigeria - Katsina.svg
| map_alt                  = 
| map_caption              = Location of Katsina State in Nigeria
| coordinates              = 
| coor_pinpoint            = 
| coordinates_footnotes    = 
| subdivision_type         = Country
| subdivision_name         = 
| established_title        = Date created
| established_date         = 23 September 1987
| seat_type                = Capital
| seat                     = Katsina
| government_footnotes     = 
| governing_body           = Government of Katsina State
| leader_party             = APC
| leader_title             = Governor  (List)
| leader_name              = Aminu Bello Masari
| leader_title1            = 
| leader_name1             = Mannir Yakubu (APC)
| leader_title2            = Legislature
| leader_name2             = Katsina State House of Assembly
| leader_title3            = Senators
| leader_name3             = 
| leader_title4            = Representatives
| leader_name4             = List
| unit_pref                = Metric
| area_footnotes           = 
| area_total_km2           = 24,192
| area_rank                = 17th of 36
| area_note                = 
| elevation_footnotes      = 
| elevation_m              = 
| population_footnotes     = 
| population_total         = 5,801,584
| population_as_of         = 2006 census
| population_rank          = 5th of 36
| population_density_km2   = auto
| population_note          = 
| demographics_type1       = GDP (PPP)
| demographics1_footnotes  = 
| demographics1_title1     = Year
| demographics1_info1      = 2007
| demographics1_title2     = Total
| demographics1_info2      = $6.02 billion
| demographics1_title3     = Per capita
| demographics1_info3      = $1,017
| timezone1                = WAT
| utc_offset1              = +01
| postal_code_type         = postal code
| postal_code              = 820001
| area_code_type           = 
| area_code                = 
| iso_code                 = NG-KT
| website                  = 
| blank_name_sec1          = HDI (2018)
| blank_info_sec1          = 0.454 · 30th of 37
| flag_size                = 250px
}}Katsina State' (Hausa: Jihar Katsina) (Fula: Leydi Katsina 𞤤𞤫𞤴𞤣𞤭 𞤳𞤢𞥁𞤭𞤲𞤢)'' is a state in the northwestern geopolitical zone of Nigeria. Katsina State was created in 1987, when it split from Kaduna State. Today, Katsina State borders Kaduna, Zamfara, Kano, and Jigawa States. Nicknamed the "Home of Hospitality", both the state capital and the town of Daura have been described "ancient seats of Islamic culture and learning" in Nigeria.

With over 5,800,000 residents as at 2006, Katsina State is the fifth largest state in the country by population, despite the fact that it only ranks 17th out of 36 states in terms of area. Demographically, the Hausa people are the largest ethnic group in the state, and Islam is the most practiced religion. In 2005, Katsina became the fifth state in Nigeria to adopt Sharia law.

The current Governor of Katsina State is Aminu Bello Masari, a member of the All Progressives Congress and ally of President Muhammadu Buhari. The state is considered a political stronghold of Buhari, a native of Daura, who won the state in the 2019 presidential election with almost 80% of the vote.

In recent years, Katsina has been one of the Nigerian states  hit hardest by terrorism. In 2020, over 300 children were kidnapped by the terrorist group Boko Haram in the town of Kankara.

Demography
Hausa are the largest ethnic group in the state

Religion
The state is predominantly Muslim where the Gobarau Minaret is an important building therein. Sharia is valid in the entire state but meanly for the muslims. The Church of Nigeria has a Diocese of Katsina. The Redeemed Christian Church of God and the Roman Catholic Church are fairly present in the state.

Local government areas

Katsina State comprises 34 local government areas:

 Bakori
 Batagarawa
 Batsari
 Baure
 Bindawa
 Charanchi
 Dan Musa
 Dandume
 Danja
 Daura
 Dutsi
 Dutsin-Ma
 Faskari
 Funtua
 Ingawa
 Jibia
 Kafur
 Kaita
 Kankara
 Kankia
 Katsina
 Kurfi
 Kusada
 Mai'Adua
 Malumfashi
 Mani
 Mashi
 Matazu
 Musawa
 Rimi
 Sabuwa
 Safana
 Sandamu
 Zango

Education

Katsina State is a centre of both formal and informal education. Umaru Musa Yar'adua University is a public university owned by the state government. Al-Qalam University, the first Islamic university in Nigeria is privately owned. Federal University, Dutsin-Ma is owned by the federal government as well as Federal College of Education, Katsina (affiliated to Bayero University Kano). National Open University of Nigeria, Isa Kaita College of Education Dutsinma (affiliated to Ahmadu Bello University, Zaria), a state owned college of education. Cherish Institute Batsari, a privately owned university awarding degree in health courses.

Impact of the COVID-19 pandemic in Katsina State
In spite of measures taken by the state government to prevent the spread of COVID-19 into the state, on 7 April 2020, a doctor in Daura local government area died of cases related to Coronavirus and his family members were tested positive. Later, one of the doctor's patients also died. 
To contain the spread of the virus, state government ordered lockdown in the state and dispatched police to ensure obedience of the law. However, there have been cases of violating the order and people accused the government for locking down worshiping grounds such as churches and Juma'ah mosques while major markets such as Yar Kutungu, Himata, Greenhouse, Mudassir etc were operating. There was a clash between police and youths in Kusada local government area resulting to death and arrests of civilians.

Notable people from Katsina State

 
 Abba Musa Rimi, Governor of Kaduna State 1980–1983
 Abdulmuminu Kabir Usman, Emir of Katsina
 Aminu Bello Masari former speaker house of representatives 2003 to 2007 and current Governor of the State
 Faruk Umar Faruk CON, Current and 60th Emir of Daura
 Habu Daura, Commissioner of Police and he was the acting Administrator of Bayelsa State, from February to June 1997
 Hamza Rafindadi Zayyad, former head of the Technical Committee on Privatization and Commercialization
 Hassan Katsina, Military governor of the northern region 1966–1967.
 Ibrahim Coomassie, Inspector General of Police 1993–1999
 Ibrahim M. Ida, Senator for Katsina Central constituency of Katsina State, Nigeria, taking office on 29 May 2007 and member of All Progressive Congress APC
 Ibrahim Shema, Governor of Katsina State 2007–2015
 Isa Kaita, first northern Nigeria minister of education and speaker of the house of parliament
 Ja'afar Mahmud Adam, Salafist Islamic scholar aligned with the Izala Society
 Lawal Kaita, Governor of Kaduna State 1983
 Lawal Musa Daura, Director General of the Nigerian State Security Service
 Magaji Muhammed, former Minister of Internal affairs, former Minister of industries and former Nigerian Ambassador to the Kingdom of Saudi Arabia. 
 Mahmud Kanti Bello, Former Chief Whip of the Senate
 Mamman Shata, a Hausa griot/musician.
 Mohammed Bello, former Chief Justice of the Supreme Court
 Mohammed Tukur Liman former majority leader of the Nigerian Senate.
 Muhammadu Buhari, Military Head of State 1983–1985, Chairman PTF and President of Nigeria since 29 May 2015
 Muhammadu Dikko Yusufu Inspector General of Police from 1975 to 1979
 Muhammadu Dikko, Emir of Katsina 1906–1944.
 Saddik Abdullahi Mahuta, former Chief Judge of Katsina State from 1991 to 2013 and the 11th Galadiman Katsina, District Head of Malumfashi.
 Sani Ahmed Daura, Lagos State commissioner of police 1990, and first Governor of Yobe State 1991–1992
 Sani Zangon Daura, Federal Minister of Agriculture and Rural Development 1999–2000, Federal Minister of Environment 2000 – 2001
 Shehu Musa Yar'Adua, politician, major general and Military Vice President 1976–1979
 Sunusi Mamman, a two time Vice Chancellor of Umaru Musa Yaradua University, Katsina.
 Tajudeen Abdul-Raheem, Pan-Africanist, Oxford Rhodes Scholar and Former Deputy Director of United Nations Millennium Campaign for Africa 1961–2009
 Umar Farouk Abdulmutallab, sentenced to life imprisonment in the United States for attempting to bomb Northwest Airlines Flight 253 on Christmas Day, 2009.
 Umaru Musa Yar'Adua, Governor of the State 1999–2007, and President of Nigeria 2007–2010
 Umaru Mutallab, business and banking veteran and also a former Minister of economic development.
 Ummarun Dallaje was the 39th Islamic Leader of Katsina, the first Fulani emir, as well as the patriarch of the Dallazawa dynasty.
 Yakubu Musa Katsina, Islamic scholar.

Geography 
It is situated on latitude between 110° 07' 49N' 130 2257" and Longitude 6052'03East and 990 02' East. The state is from the tropical grassland known as savannah to the north and the state has two major seasons which are the rainy season and dry season.

Politics

The state government is led by a democratical elected governor who works closely with members of the state's house of assembly. The capital city of the state is Kastina

Electoral system

The governor of each state is selected using a modified two-round system. To be elected in the first round, a candidate must receive the plurality of the vote and over 25% of the vote in at least two -third of the State local government Areas. If no candidate passes threshold, a second round will be held between the top candidate and the next candidate to have received a plurality of votes in the highest number of local government Areas.

References

 
States of Nigeria
States and territories established in 1987
1987 establishments in Nigeria